Uncial 0268 (in the Gregory-Aland numbering), is a Greek uncial manuscript of the New Testament. Palaeographically it has been assigned to the 7th century.

Description 

The codex contains two small parts of the Gospel of John 1:30-33, on one parchment leaf (11 cm by 8 cm). The text is written in one column per page, 10 lines per page, in uncial letters.

Currently it is dated by the INTF to the 7th century.

Text 
The Greek text of this codex is too brief to determine its textual character. Aland did not placed it in any of Categories of New Testament manuscripts.

Location 
Currently the codex is housed at the Berlin State Museums (P. 6790) in Berlin.

See also 

 List of New Testament uncials
 Textual criticism

References

Further reading 

 Kurt Treu, "Drei Berliner Papyri mit nomina sacra", Studia Patristica 10, T & U 30 (Berlin, 1970). 

Greek New Testament uncials
7th-century biblical manuscripts